The Robert Bosch Foundation Fellowship Program was established in 1984 to promote closer US-German ties. It is fully funded by the Robert Bosch Foundation (German: Robert Bosch Stiftung), one of the largest foundations in Germany.

Each year 15 young professionals from the United States are accepted through a competitive application process to take part in the program for a period of 9–12 months.  The primary components of the Bosch Fellowship include high-level work placements at private, governmental, and non-governmental institutions in Germany, as well as intensive seminars on contemporary German issues. During seminars, Bosch Fellows meet with key decision-makers from the public and private sectors throughout Germany and Europe. Participants in the Bosch Fellowship are recruited from business administration, journalism, law, public policy, and closely related fields. No German language skills are required at the time of application, and intensive German language study is offered before the start of the fellowship.  The fellowship period generally begins in September and ends in May of the following year.

The Bosch Fellowship offers the following benefits to participants:
Two high-level work phases at institutions in Germany including in federal and local governments, private corporations, media outlets, and NGOs;
Three seminars across Europe, each lasting several weeks that address German, European, and transatlantic issues;
A monthly stipend; currently EUR 3,000 from September through May, with a smaller stipend during the summer language training
Health, accident, and liability insurance;
Financial support for an accompanying spouse and children, including 50% of travel costs, supplemental living stipend, health insurance, and limited funding for language training;
Accommodation and roundtrip travel for orientation program in Washington D.C.;
Transatlantic flight and seminar travel throughout Europe;
Generous funding for language training in the U.S. and Germany before the program start;
Membership in active Robert Bosch Foundation Fellowship Alumni Association with over 480 members.

Through this fellowship program, the Robert Bosch Stiftung aims to contribute to the growth of German-American relations. The goal of the fellowship is to develop a corps of future U.S. leaders and foster greater transatlantic understanding.

Cultural Vistas acts as the U.S. representative and has administered this professional fellowship in Germany since its inception in 1984.

Notable alumni
Denis McDonough, White House Chief of Staff
Christopher A. Kojm, former Chairman, United States National Intelligence Council
Adam Posen, economist, president of Peterson Institute for International Economics
Gayle Tzemach Lemmon, journalism, senior fellow at Council on Foreign Relations
Anne C. Richard, Assistant Secretary of State for Population, Refugees, and Migration
Sandi Peterson, Group Worldwide Chairman, Johnson & Johnson
Daniel Mudd, former President & CEO of Fannie Mae
Christine A. Elder, U.S. Ambassador to Liberia
Philip H. Gordon, diplomat & foreign policy expert, senior fellow at Council on Foreign Relations
Markos Kounalakis, journalist
Mary Wiltenburg, journalist
Connie Moran, Mayor of Ocean Springs, MS
Peter Laufer, journalist
James Kirchick, journalist
James Freis, global fraud expert and former Director of the Financial Crimes Enforcement Network (FinCEN)

External links
Cultural Vistas – Robert Bosch Foundation Fellowship Program
Robert Bosch Stiftung, retrieved 2009-08-24
Robert Bosch Foundation Alumni Association, retrieved 2009-08-25

Foundations based in Germany
Germany–United States relations
Organizations established in 1984
Fellowships